Mawson's Huts are the collection of buildings located at Cape Denison, Commonwealth Bay, in the far eastern sector of the Australian Antarctic Territory, some 3000 km south of Hobart. The buildings were erected and occupied by the Australasian Antarctic Expedition (AAE) of 1911-1914, led by geologist and explorer Sir Douglas Mawson.

Mawson's Huts are rare as one of just six surviving sites from the Heroic Era of Antarctic exploration. The Australasian Antarctic Expedition was the only Heroic Era expedition organised, manned and supported primarily by Australians.

The huts included a magnetograph hut, used to measure variations in the south magnetic pole; an absolute magnetic hut, which was used as a reference point for studies in the magnetograph hut; and the transit hut, an astronomical observatory.

The most important building at the site is the winter living quarters, known as "Mawson's Hut". This pyramid-roofed hut was home to the eighteen men of the AAE main base party in 1912, and the seven (including Douglas Mawson) who stayed on for an unplanned second year in 1913. The hut combines two sections - the living quarters and the workshop, prefabricated in Sydney and Melbourne respectively, and shipped to the site for construction in 1912 by the AAE team.

Radio 
Using a wireless relay station on Macquarie Island, it was possible to contact the Australian mainland by radio. The AAE was the first expedition that had this possibility. Meteorological observations got transmitted by the system continuously. It was the first use of radio on the Antarctic continent.

The main hut 
The Verandas were used for many different things including housing the sled dogs.

The main hut contains a kitchen, a laundry, a storage and a sleeping room.

Conservation and heritage recognition 

Expeditions undertaken by the Australian government (through the Australian Antarctic Division since the late 1970s) and private non-profit conservation organisations (notably the two Project Blizzard expeditions of 1984/85 and 1985/86, and the Mawson's Huts Foundation since 1997) have carried out conservation research, surveys and work on the huts. In addition to archaeological recording, removal of snow from inside the huts and ongoing maintenance, recent interventions (1998 and 2006) have been to encapsulate the failing timber roofs with new timber over-cladding in order to weatherproof the interiors.

The site is recognised under the Antarctic Treaty as a Historic Site & Monument (HSM 77) since 1972, and placed within an Antarctic Specially Protected Area (ASPA 162) and an Antarctic Specially Managed Area (ASMA 3) in 2004. It is also on the Australian National Heritage List, Commonwealth Heritage List and the defunct Register of the National Estate.

The Australian Antarctic Division and the Australian Minister for the Environment & Water Resources released for public comment a new management plan for the Mawson's Huts Historic Site in July 2007. The plan set out the principles that  guided activities to preserve the heritage values of the site in the lead-up to the centenary of the Australasian Antarctic Expedition.

Travel to Mawson's Huts 
Chimu Adventures operate a voyage to Mawson's Huts every year from Hobart, Tasmania. The voyages generally stop at Macquarie Island en route and return via the New Zealand Subantarctic islands.

Replica Hut 
A replica of Mawson's Hut at Cape Denison was constructed in downtown Hobart in 2013.  The replica hut was built as part of an ongoing effort to raise funds for conservation work at Cape Denison.  The replica hut also helps educate visitors about Douglas Mawson and the Australasian Antarctic Expedition.

References

Resources 
 Australian Antarctic Division (2007 Mawson's Huts Historic Site Management Plan 2007-2012.
 Mackay, R (2005) 'Ice, icon and identity: the meaning of Mawson's huts'. In Lydon, J & Ireland, T (eds) Object Lessons:  Archaeology & Heritage in Australia.
 Mawson, D (1915) Home of the Blizzard: being the story of the Australasian Antarctic Expedition, 1911-1914.
 Pearson, M (1992).  'Expedition huts in Antarctica: 1899-1917'. Polar Record 28, 167: 261-276.

External links 
 Australian National Heritage listing for Mawson's Huts and Mawson's Huts Historic Site
 Home of the Blizzard — the Australasian Antarctic Expedition
 The Mawson's Huts Foundation
 "Frozen in Time" fulldome planetarium show about Mawson's Huts
 "Frozen in Time" fulldome planetarium show about Mawson's Huts - online video

Australian Antarctic Territory
Science and technology in Australia
Science and technology in Antarctica
Heroic Age of Antarctic Exploration
Buildings and structures completed in 1912
Australian National Heritage List
Australasian Antarctic Expedition
George V Land
Antarctic Specially Protected Areas
Historic buildings and structures in Antarctica
1912 establishments in Antarctica
Australian Antarctic Territory places listed on the defunct Register of the National Estate
History of science and technology in Australia